"The Most Unwanted Song" is an avant-garde novelty song created by artists Komar and Melamid and composer Dave Soldier in 1997. The song was designed to incorporate lyrical and musical elements that were deemed annoying to most people by a poll. These elements included bagpipes, cowboy music, an opera singer rapping, and a children's choir that urged listeners to "do all [their] shopping at Walmart!"

The song, along with its counterpart "The Most Wanted Song" on the CD The People's Choice: Music was originally sold at the Dia's bookstore and released in 2001 by Soldier's Mulatta Records. In 2019, The People's Choice: Music was remastered and reissued on vinyl, CD and cassette by Needlejuice Records.

Background 
Beginning in 1994, Russian-born American graphic artists Vitaly Komar and Alexander Melamid created a series of "most wanted" and "least wanted" paintings ("Выбор народа"), based on visual aspects found to be most "wanted" and "unwanted" by people as measured in an opinion poll conducted by a professional polling company. These paintings were included in the book Painting by Numbers: Komar and Melamid's Scientific Guide to Art, published in 1997.

The artists were approached by a gallery owner to make a CD for him (ultimately, the Dia Art Foundation helped to release the CD) and they approached  American composer and performer Dave Soldier (a.k.a. David Sulzer, neuroscientist) with whom they were working on an opera, Naked Revolution, for The Kitchen in Manhattan. Soldier suggested adapting the concept of Komar and Melamid's The People's Choice painting series, to create a musical project, titled The People's Choice: Music, which again used the opinions of the public, as measured by polling surveys, to determine which elements of the medium were 'most wanted' and 'least wanted'.  The polls were written by Soldier and taken via the Dia Foundation in the spring of 1996. 

According to Soldier's poll, the survey of approximately 500 Dia visitors and participators on an internet poll revealed that the themes, instruments and other aspects that people least wanted to hear included cowboy music, bagpipes, accordions, opera, rapping, children's voices, tubas, drum machines and advertising jingles. They then incorporated all of these elements into a 22-minute-long song, titled "The Most Unwanted Song".

Soldier, Komar and Melamid wrote "The Most Unwanted Song" with lyricist Nina Mankin. They debuted the song at a 1997 performance in New York where Komar and Melamid together played a bass drum and Soldier a banjo, joined by soprano Dina Emerson, a large ensemble conducted by Norman Yamada, and a children's choir.

Lyrics and music 

The main vocals of the song are provided by Emerson, whose high-pitched, operatic rapping is largely Western-themed (though one verse describes reading Ludwig Wittgenstein's Tractatus Logico-Philosophicus, followed by an interlude where she sings a brief excerpt from it over pipe organ).

In addition to the rapping, a children's choir sings about various holidays (Christmas, Easter, Yom Kippur, Ramadan and Labor Day, among others), ending each verse with the line "Do all your shopping at Walmart!" Near the end of the song, Mankin shouts various non-sequitur political phrases through a bullhorn–culminating in blaming the audience for slavery, imperialism, and genocide–followed by a "folk song" refrain sung in unison by her, Emerson, the choir, and "with luck, [the] audience".

Musically, "The Most Unwanted Song" veers suddenly and frequently between drum machine-driven hip hop (with a bassline provided by tuba), atonal harp and organ interludes, bagpipes, "elevator music", polka, and country, interspersed or simultaneously with numerous segments of free improvisation which Soldier terms "slams".

"The Most Wanted Song"
For The People's Choice: Music CD, "The Most Unwanted Song" was paired with "The Most Wanted Song", which incorporated musical elements that were "wanted" by listeners, again as determined by a public opinion survey. Instruments such as saxophone, electric guitar, bass, piano and drums, and lyrics about love were "most wanted" by the survey respondents, and are included in the song, which has been described as "Celine Dion-esque". The only instrument that appears on both the wanted and unwanted songs is the synthesizer. Furthermore, since "intellectual stimulation" was voted both wanted and unwanted, Wittgenstein is mentioned in both songs as an inside joke. The vocals for "The Most Wanted Song" are provided by Ada Dyer and Ronnie Gent; Vernon Reid of Living Colour is featured on guitar and provides a solo.

Ironically, many critics preferred "The Most Unwanted Song" over "The Most Wanted Song". Eliot Van Buskirk of Wired wrote that "The Most Wanted Song" itself not only "sounds horrible", but it also sounds much rougher than "The Most Unwanted Song". Meanwhile, Jordie Yow of The Tyee wrote that "all of the elements mish-mashed together into something bland, boring and completely terrible" while enjoying "The Most Unwanted Song" much more. Sarah Vowell of Salon wrote that she did not "want to be seen as a flaming contrarian apologist" for preferring "The Most Unwanted Song".

Notes

References

External links 
 
 This American Life episode that discusses creation of Most Unwanted Song
Dave Soldier's Bandcamp page stream both songs

1997 songs
Novelty songs
Comedy songs
Songs about music
Songs about philosophers